The County of Guînes, was a Flemish fief and later French fief in the Middle Ages.

The county was split from the County of Boulogne in about 988.

Counts

?-c.965 - Siegfried, Count of Guînes
Although he never seemed to be formally designated as Count, he is historically referred to as such.
c.965-? - Ardolf, Count of Guînes
Raoul, Count of Guînes (son of Ardolf), also known as Ralph or Rodolphe
Eustace, Count of Guînes (son of Raoul)
Baldwin I, Count of Guînes (son of Eustace), also known as Baudouin
Robert Manasses, Count of Guînes (son of Baldwin I)
1138-1146 - Aubrey de Vere - jure exoris 
?-1169 - Arnoul I, Count de Guînes (son of Gisela of Guînes, daughter of Baldwin I)
1169-1205 - Baldwin II, Count of Guînes
1205-1220 - Arnold II of Guînes
1220-1244 - Baldwin III, Count of Guînes
1244-? - Arnould III, Count of Guînes
Baldwin IV, Count of Guînes
1294–1302 - John II of Brienne, Count of Guînes
1302–1344 - Raoul I of Brienne, Count of Guînes, Constable of France.
1344–1350 - Raoul II of Brienne, Count of Guînes, forfeited.
The county was confiscated by King John II of France in 1350 and later granted to Georges de La Trémoille in 1398.
1398–1446 - Georges de La Trémoille
1446–1483 - Louis I de La Trémoille
1483–1525 - Louis II de la Trémoille
1525–1541 - François II de La Trémoille
1541–1577 - Louis III de La Trémoille
1577–1604 - Claude de La Trémoille
1604–1674 - Henri de La Trémoille

Citations

States and territories established in the 980s
States and territories disestablished in 1350
Lists of counts
Medieval France
Counties of France